NA-134 may refer to either:

 NA-134 (Lahore-XII), a constituency for the National Assembly of Pakistan
 NA-134 (Sheikhupura-IV), a former constituency for the National Assembly of Pakistan

National Assembly Constituencies of Pakistan